The Muso Awards is a charity music award ceremony held in London, England, that began in September 2002.  The awards are voted "by musicians, for musicians", and the ceremony features live performances by a variety of artists. The 2005 event was held at Koko, in Camden Town, very few winners were present to receive their awards.

2005 Awards
Best Album - Up All Night by Razorlight
Best Band - The Futureheads
Best Single - "Freakin' Out" by Graham Coxon
Best Female Vocal – Alison Goldfrapp
Best Lead Guitar - Barry Hyde from The Futureheads
Best Songwriter - Damon Albarn (for Gorillaz)
Best Live Act - Kaiser Chiefs
Best New Act - Arctic Monkeys
Best International Act - The Strokes
Best Gig - Pink Floyd at Live 8
Best Male Vocal  - Gaz Coombes from Supergrass
Best Drummer - Andy Burrows of Razorlight
Best Bass Guitar - Mani of Primal Scream
Best Keyboard/Other - Martin Duffy of Primal Scream
The Muso's Muso - Primal Scream
The Music Writers & Media Award - Babyshambles

2002 Awards
Best Album - Nitin Sawhney by Prophesy
Best Single - Ian Brown by "Whispers
Best Vocal - PJ Harvey
Best Guitar - Jonny Greenwood (Radiohead)
Best Drummer - Alan White (Oasis)
Best Bassist - Peter Hook (New Order)
Best Keyboard/other - Tony Rodgers (Charlatans)
Best Songwriter - Damon Gough
Best New Act - Haven
Best Live Act - The Charlatans
Muso's Muso - Paul Weller

References

External links 
BBC - Muso Awards

British music awards